BDJ Team is a peer-reviewed online magazine published by Nature Research on behalf of the British Dental Association - of which it is a fellow publication of the latter's official journal, the British Dental Journal. The editor-in-chief is Stephen Hancocks. The journal replaced Vital, which was published between 2003 and 2013.

Each issue includes one hour of verifiable continuing professional development (CPD) on topics recommended by the General Dental Council.

References

External links 
 

Dentistry journals
English-language journals
Monthly journals
Nature Research academic journals
Publications established in 2014
Open access journals
Academic journals associated with learned and professional societies
2014 establishments in the United Kingdom